The INCI names ceteareth-n (where n is a number) refer to polyoxyethylene ethers of a mixture of high molecular mass saturated fatty alcohols, mainly cetyl alcohol (m = 15) and stearyl alcohol (m = 17).  The number n indicates the average number of ethylene oxide residues in the polyoxyethylene chain.

These compounds are non-ionic surfactants that work by attracting both water and oil at the same time, frequently used as emulsifiers in soaps and cosmetics.

List of ceteareth compounds

 Ceteareth-2
 Ceteareth-3
 Ceteareth-4
 Ceteareth-5
 Ceteareth-6
 Ceteareth-7
 Ceteareth-8
 Ceteareth-9
 Ceteareth-10
 Ceteareth-11
 Ceteareth-12
 Ceteareth-13
 Ceteareth-15
 Ceteareth-16
 Ceteareth-17
 Ceteareth-18
 Ceteareth-20 (CAS # 68439-49-6) 
 Ceteareth-22
 Ceteareth-23
 Ceteareth-25
 Ceteareth-27
 Ceteareth-28
 Ceteareth-29
 Ceteareth-30
 Ceteareth-33
 Ceteareth-34
 Ceteareth-40
 Ceteareth-50
 Ceteareth-55
 Ceteareth-60
 Ceteareth-80
 Ceteareth-100

References

Ethers
Cosmetics chemicals